2-Methyl-1-butanol (IUPAC name, also called active amyl alcohol) is an organic compound with the formula CH3CH2CH(CH3)CH2OH.  It is one of several isomers of amyl alcohol.  A colorless liquid, it occurs naturally in trace amounts and has attracted some attention as a potential biofuel, exploiting its hydrophobic (gasoline-like) and branched structure.  It is chiral.

Occurrence 
2-Methyl-1-butanol is a component of many mixtures of commercial amyl alcohols. It is one of the many components of the aroma of various fungi and fruit, e.g., the summer truffle, tomato, and cantaloupe.

Production and reactions 
2-Methyl-1-butanol has been produced from glucose by genetically modified E. coli.  2-Keto-3-methylvalerate, a precursor to threonine, is converted to the target alcohol by the sequential action of 2-keto acid decarboxylase and dehydrogenase. It can be derived from fusel oil (because it occurs naturally in fruits such as grapes) or manufactured by either the oxo process or via the halogenation of pentane.

See also 
 2-Methyl-2-butanol

References 

Alcohol solvents
Primary alcohols
Alkanols